This article lists all power stations in Saudi Arabia.

Fossil fuel

Natural gas turbine

Oil-fired

Renewable

Solar

Wind

Storage

Pumped hydroelectric

See also 

Energy in Saudi Arabia

References 

Saudi Arabia
Energy in Saudi Arabia
Power stations